Crumhorn Mountain is a small mountain chain located in Central New York region of New York by Portlandville, New York.

References

Mountains of Otsego County, New York
Mountains of New York (state)